William Kaye Lamb  (May 11, 1904 – August 24, 1999) was a Canadian historian, archivist, librarian, and civil servant.

Career
Born in New Westminster, British Columbia, Lamb received his BA in 1927 and MA in 1930 from the University of British Columbia. He completed his PhD at the London School of Economics in 1933, under the tutelage of Harold Laski. From 1936 to 1937, he was President of the British Columbia Historical Federation. From 1934 to 1940, he was the Provincial Archivist and Librarian of British Columbia. In 1936, he was also appointed Superintendent of the BC Public Libraries Commission. From 1940 to 1948, he was the University Librarian of the University of British Columbia. From 1948 to 1968 he was the Dominion Archivist of Canada, and from 1953 to 1968 he was the first National Librarian of Canada.

In 1949, he was elected a fellow of the Royal Society of Canada and was its president from 1965 to 1966. In 1969, he was made an Officer of the Order of Canada. Between 1964-1965 he served as president of the Society of American Archivists.

Lamb specialized in the early history of British Columbia. He edited and wrote a number of scholarly books relating to explorers of Western Canada, including George Vancouver, Daniel Williams Harmon, and Sir Alexander MacKenzie, as well as a volume on the history of the Canadian Pacific Railway.

Personal life
In 1939, he married Wessie Tipping, and they had a daughter, Elizabeth (Lamb) Hawkins.

References

Bibliography

External links
 William Kaye Lamb at The Canadian Encyclopedia
 W. Kaye Lamb Award for service to seniors at Ex Libris Association
 William Kaye Lamb biography at Ex Libris Association
 W. Kaye Lamb Award for the Best Student works at British Columbia Historical Federation

1904 births
1999 deaths
Alumni of the London School of Economics
Canadian archivists
20th-century Canadian civil servants
Canadian male non-fiction writers
Canadian librarians
Fellows of the Royal Society of Canada
Officers of the Order of Canada
People from New Westminster
University of British Columbia alumni
20th-century Canadian historians
Presidents of the Society of American Archivists
Presidents of the Canadian Historical Association